The 2003 Bass Pro Shops MBNA 500 was the 33rd stock car race of the 2003 NASCAR Winston Cup Series season and the forty-fourth iteration of the event. The race was held over two days from Sunday, October 26, 2003, to Monday, October 27 due to rain on lap 39 on Sunday, forcing the delay of the event. The race was held in Hampton, Georgia at Atlanta Motor Speedway, a  permanent asphalt quad-oval intermediate speedway. The race took the scheduled 325 laps to complete. At race's end, Hendrick Motorsports driver Jeff Gordon would win under caution when with three laps to go, Dale Earnhardt Jr. bumped Ryan Newman into the wall. The win was Gordon's 64th career NASCAR Winston Cup Series win and his third of the season. To fill out the podium, Tony Stewart of Joe Gibbs Racing and Jimmie Johnson of Hendrick Motorsports would finish second and third, respectively.

Background 

Atlanta Motor Speedway (formerly Atlanta International Raceway) is a track in Hampton, Georgia, 20 miles (32 km) south of Atlanta. It is a 1.54-mile (2.48 km) quad-oval track with a seating capacity of 111,000. It opened in 1960 as a 1.5-mile (2.4 km) standard oval. In 1994, 46 condominiums were built over the northeastern side of the track. In 1997, to standardize the track with Speedway Motorsports' other two 1.5-mile (2.4 km) ovals, the entire track was almost completely rebuilt. The frontstretch and backstretch were swapped, and the configuration of the track was changed from oval to quad-oval. The project made the track one of the fastest on the NASCAR circuit.

Entry list 

*Withdrew.

Practice

First practice 
The first practice session was held on Friday, October 24, at 3:20 PM EST, and would last for 2 hours.

Second practice 
The second practice session was held on Saturday, October 25, at 9:30 AM EST, and would last for 45 minutes.

Third and final practice 
The third and final practice session, sometimes referred to as Happy Hour, was held on Saturday, October 25, at 11:10 AM EST, and would last for 45 minutes.

Qualifying 
Qualifying was held on Friday, October 24, at 7:05 PM EST. Each driver would have two laps to set a fastest time; the fastest of the two would count as their official qualifying lap. Positions 1-36 would be decided on time, while positions 37-43 would be based on provisionals. Six spots are awarded by the use of provisionals based on owner's points. The seventh is awarded to a past champion who has not otherwise qualified for the race. If no past champ needs the provisional, the next team in the owner points will be awarded a provisional.

Six drivers would fail to qualify: Jeff Green, Buckshot Jones, Larry Foyt, Mike Wallace, Billy Bigley, and Shelby Howard.

Full qualifying results

Race results

References 

2003 NASCAR Winston Cup Series
NASCAR races at Atlanta Motor Speedway
October 2003 sports events in the United States
2003 in sports in Georgia (U.S. state)